Sayed Ali Bechir (Arabic: سيد علي البشير; born at 6 September 1982) is a Qatari football player of Mauritanian descent. He is currently unattached.

Bechir played for Qatar at the 1999 FIFA U-17 World Championship in New Zealand.
He played for the Qatari club Al-Arabi before playing for Al-Rayyan Sports club. He scored one of the non forgettable goals for Qatari fans against Iraq in the FIFA Worldcup South Africa 2010 qualifiers which made Qatar complete the Qualifications till the last round.

References

External links

1982 births
Living people
Qatari footballers
Qatar international footballers
Al-Arabi SC (Qatar) players
Al-Rayyan SC players
Umm Salal SC players
Al-Wakrah SC players
2007 AFC Asian Cup players
Naturalised citizens of Qatar
Footballers at the 2002 Asian Games
Qatar Stars League players
Qatari people of Mauritanian descent
Association football forwards
Asian Games competitors for Qatar